Ulrik Lindkvist (born 5 March 1981), is a retired Danish professional football (soccer) player, who played as a defender. He played three games for various Danish youth national team selections.

Lindkvist played for FC Midtjylland (FCM), and he is a product of the youth work in the club. He mostly plays the position of left back, although he can play almost every position on the field. He prefers to play in the right side, in more attacking positions of the field.

In July 2010 he made a transfer to Vejle in the Danish First Division.

References

External links
 AGF profile
Danish national team profile
Career statistics at Danmarks Radio

1981 births
Living people
Danish men's footballers
Denmark under-21 international footballers
FC Midtjylland players
Aarhus Gymnastikforening players
Danish Superliga players
Association football fullbacks
Ikast FS players
Association football defenders